The Main Court Building is an office building in Buffalo, New York located on the corner of Main Street and Court Street across the Buffalo Metro Rail from Lafayette Square. The tower is located across Court Street from the Liberty Building.

History
The building was built in 1963 to serve as the Western Savings Bank headquarters. Delaware North purchased the property in 1990 and moved its headquarters there, later leaving in 1999 for 40 Fountain Plaza. The building changed hands in July 2001 and again in late 2014. The building is currently owned by Main Street Buffalo Properties, LP and managed by Priam Enterprises, LLC.

See also
List of tallest buildings in Buffalo

External links
 Historical photos of building site
 Emporis page

References

Skyscraper office buildings in Buffalo, New York
Office buildings completed in 1963
Modernist architecture in New York (state)